One Can't Always Tell is a short American silent comedy film.

Release
One Can't Always Tell was released on May 31, 1913, in the United States, where it was presented as a split-reel with If Dreams Came True; or, Who'd Have Thunk It?, another Vitagraph comedy. It reached Ashland, Oregon, in July, 1913, and Ocala, Florida, in August. It was released in England on September 18, 1913, reached Christchurch, New Zealand, a month later, and Dunedin in November.

References

External links
 

1913 films
1913 comedy films
Silent American comedy films
American black-and-white films
1913 short films
American silent short films
American comedy short films
Films directed by Van Dyke Brooke
1910s American films